Karel Majek (born 15 July 1992) is a Czech Grand Prix motorcycle racer.

Career statistics

Grand Prix motorcycle racing

By season

Races by year

References

1992 births
Living people
Czech motorcycle racers
125cc World Championship riders
People from Vyškov
Sportspeople from the South Moravian Region